Major general Welbore Ellis Doyle (1758–1797) was the third Military Governor of British Ceylon. He was appointed on 1 January 1797 and was Governor until 2 July 1797. He was succeeded by Peter Bonnevaux.

Military service
Doyle was born in 1758 in Dublin, the fifth son of Charles and Elizabeth Doyle of Bramblestown, County Kilkenny, and a younger brother of John Doyle.

He joined the army in 1770 as an Ensign in the 55th Foot, and was promoted Lieutenant in September 1773. He served in North America with his brother from 1775, seeing action in the American War of Independence and was elevated to Captain of the 55th Foot in November 1777. Under Rawdon he served at the Battle of Camden, 25 April 1781, after leading a small force to raid Snow Island in March. He sailed back to Great Britain with his brother and Rawdon later that year, but was captured en route by the French fleet, to be later exchanged.

He was appointed Lieutenant-Colonel of the 105th Foot (former "Volunteers of Ireland") in March 1782, but placed on half-pay after the peace. He was Military Envoy to Poland and Warsaw during the 1780s. Doyle was made Lieutenant-Colonel of the 14th Foot in March 1789, and commanded the regiment in the Flanders Campaign under the Duke of York in 1793. He distinguished himself at the Battle of Famars 22 May by leading an attack on an entrenched camp. After an initial rebuff from a French force that could be heard playing the patriotic march "Ça Ira" to urge on its men, Doyle ordered his own men to strike up the same tune, saying "We'll beat them to their own damned tune". The position was taken and the 14th Foot were ordered by York to henceforth use "Ça Ira" as their marching tune in honour of the occasion. Doyle was appointed Brigadier-General in November 1794, and promoted Major-General in February 1795.

After the evacuation from Holland he joined the Royalist survivors of Quiberon at the Île d'Yeu with 4 British foot regiments and 3 Royalist cavalry units from September, commanding the total 5,000 men. He commanded the attack on Hedic and Houat in August. Eventually this force was obliged to withdraw due to serious supply problems after the failure of the Vendeans to raise support.

Doyle was Colonel of the 53rd (Shropshire) Regiment of Foot from November 1796 – January 1798. He was then dispatched to India, spending some time at the Cape of Good Hope in 1796. Appointed Military Commander in Chief at Ceylon after his arrival on 1 January 1797, he died there suddenly on 30 June, aged 39.

Further reading
A Hundred Years of Conflict being some records of the services of six generals of the Doyle family 1756–1856 (Colonel Arthur Doyle 1911)

References

 

1758 births
1797 deaths
Military personnel from Dublin (city)
18th-century Anglo-Irish people
Governors of British Ceylon
British expatriates in Sri Lanka
19th-century British military personnel
British Army major generals
British Army personnel of the French Revolutionary Wars
General Officers Commanding, Ceylon
British people in colonial India